Villas in the Sky is a building in Riyadh, Saudi Arabia. Construction was started on 1 January 2009, and completed on 31 December 2013.

See also 
 List of tallest buildings in Saudi Arabia

Buildings and structures in Riyadh